Ailill mac Cathail Con-cen-máthair (died 701) was a King of Munster from the Glendamnach branch of the Eóganachta. He was the son of Cathal Cú-cen-máthair mac Cathail (d. 665) and brother of his predecessor Finguine mac Cathail Con-cen-máthair (d. 696).

Though mentioned in the annals as king and in the saga Senchas Fagbála Caisil "The Story of the Finding of Cashel", he is omitted from lists in the Laud Synchronisms and the Book of Leinster.<ref>,{MS folio 150a} Fland cecinit</ref> Also in the list of signatories to the signing of Adomnan's Law of the Innocents at Birr in 697; he is only mentioned as king of Mag Feimin while Eterscél mac Máele Umai (d. 721) is named king of Munster.

Ailil had three sons: Fogantach, Aonghus and Dubhda but none of his descendants were kings.

Notes

See also
Kings of Munster

ReferencesAnnals of TigernachT.M. Charles-Edwards, Early Christian IrelandFrancis J. Byrne, Irish Kings and High-KingsBook of Leinster,{MS folio 150a} Fland cecinit.Book of Munster, Rev.Eugene O'KeeffeLaud SynchronismsThe Chronology of the Irish Annals'', Daniel P. McCarthy

External links
CELT: Corpus of Electronic Texts at University College Cork

Kings of Munster
7th-century births
701 deaths
7th-century Irish monarchs
8th-century Irish monarchs